Crassula rubricaulis (Red-stem Crassula) is a succulent plant native to the coastal mountains of the Eastern Cape and Western Cape of South Africa.

Description
This species can be distinguished by its fleshy, succulent leaves, which are a minimum of 2 mm in thickness. In addition, the leaves are smooth, sessile, egg-shaped (with the narrowest part against the stem), with bright red margins. The leaf normally has a faint line of hair, along its reddish margins (but the hairs tend to fall off at the leaf tip). 

In its growth form, C.rubricaulis becomes a small (30-50 cm), rounded, branching, perennial shrub, with smooth, red-brown stems ("rubricaulis"="red-stemmed"). The hard, brittle branches root if they lie against the ground. 

It produces large numbers of white, star-shaped flowers in the middle and late Summer. 

It is a close relative of the species Crassula dejecta, which also inhabits the mountains of the south western Cape.

Distribution
The Red-stem Crassula occurs around the Riviersonderend and Langeberg mountains in the west, in the coastal rocky mountain shrub around Knysna and as far east as Port Elizabeth.

References

rubricaulis
Flora of the Cape Provinces
Plants described in 1753
Taxa named by Carl Linnaeus